Virginia Alynn Matzek is an American restoration ecologist. She is an Associate Professor in Environmental Studies and Sciences at Santa Clara University.

Education
Matzek completed her Bachelor of Arts and Master of Arts at the University of California, Berkeley. In 1998, Matzek was the recipient of the UC Berkely's Outstanding Graduate Student Instructor award. In 1999, Matzek was the recipient of the UC Berkely's Teaching Effectiveness award.

While at Stanford for her doctoral studies, Matzek sidelined as a teaching assistant in the School of Humanities and Sciences. In 2005, Matzek was one of the recipients awarded the Walter J. Gores Award for Excellence in Teaching. After completing her graduate studies at Stanford alongside Peter Vitousek, she joined the Environmental Studies Institution at Santa Clara University as the director of campus and community programs and a lecturer.

Career
In 2007, while serving as the director of campus and community programs for Santa Clara University's Environmental Studies Institute, she began to teach a course entitled "The Joy of Garbage" which focused on decomposition. This was, however, her last year at Santa Clara University as she accepted a tenure-track position at California State University, Sacramento as an Assistant Professor in Environmental Studies. She proposed to continue the course "The Joy of Garbage" at California State University, Sacramento. She returned to Santa Clara in 2011.

In 2014, she was selected to sit on the board of the California Invasive Plant Council. The year after, she received a $39,643 grant from the National Science Foundation to conduct research on ecological restoration in Australia. She also received funding to study carbon credits associated with forest management strategies in France.

During the summer before the 2016–17 academic year, Matzek set up an experiment to remove and control Brachypodium sylvaticum. As well, during the term she received tenure from the university and was promoted to associate professor. Matzek later was the recipient of two research awards from the California Department of Conservation and the Mid-Peninsula Regional Open Space District.

In 2018, she received a grant to design a policy for accounting for carbon storage in restored and conserved oak woodlands in California.

Personal life
Matzek describes herself as a liberal and attended the 2017 Women's March with her two sons.

Selected publications
Global patterns of the isotopic composition of soil and plant nitrogen (2003)
Carbon sequestration and plant community dynamics following reforestation of tropical pasture (2004)
Are you what you eat? Physiological constraints on organismal stoichiometry in an elementally imbalanced world (2005)
N: P stoichiometry and protein: RNA ratios in vascular plants: an evaluation of the growth‐rate hypothesis (2009)
Climate change's impact on key ecosystem services and the human well‐being they support in the US (2013)

References

External links

Living people
University of California, Berkeley alumni
University of California, Berkeley faculty
Stanford University alumni
American women academics
Women ecologists
Year of birth missing (living people)
American science writers
21st-century American women